The 1984 Clemson Tigers men's soccer team represented the Clemson University during the 1984 NCAA Division I men's soccer season. The Tigers won their first NCAA title.  The Tigers were coached by Dr. I. M. Ibrahim, in his 18th season.  They played home games at Riggs Field.

Schedule

|-
!colspan=6 style=""| Regular season

|-
!colspan=6 style=""| NCAA Tournament

References

Clemson Tigers men's soccer seasons
Clemson
Clemson Soccer, men's
NCAA Division I Men's Soccer Tournament-winning seasons
NCAA Division I Men's Soccer Tournament College Cup seasons